Lindau is a surname. Notable people with the surname include:

 Arvid Lindau (1892–1958), Swedish pathologist
 Baruch Lindau (1759–1849), German-Jewish writer
 Gustav Lindau (1866–1923), German botanist
 Karl Lindau, pen- and stage name of Karl Gemperle (1853–1934), Austrian actor, writer and librettist 
 Paul Lindau (1839–1919), German writer
 Rudolf Lindau (1829–1910), German writer